Yasuyuki is a masculine Japanese given name.

Possible writings
Yasuyuki can be written using many different combinations of kanji characters. Here are some examples:

靖幸, "peaceful, happiness"
靖行, "peaceful, to go"
靖之, "peaceful, of"
康幸, "healthy, happiness"
康行, "healthy, to go"
康之, "healthy, of"
安幸, "tranquil, happiness"
安行, "tranquil, to go"
保幸, "preserve, happiness"
保行, "preserve, to go"
保之, "preserve, of"
泰幸, "peaceful, happiness"
泰行, "peaceful, to go"
八洲幸, "8, continent, happiness"
易幸, "divination, happiness"
安由紀, "tranquil, reason, chronicle"

The name can also be written in hiragana やすゆき or katakana ヤスユキ.

Notable people with the name
, Japanese baseball player
, Japanese video game artist, director and producer
, Japanese boxer
, Japanese footballer
, Japanese voice actor
, Japanese baseball player
, Japanese drifting driver
, Japanese footballer and manager
, Japanese footballer
, Japanese footballer
, Japanese footballer
, Japanese judoka
, Japanese baseball player
, Japanese footballer
, Japanese alpine skier
, Japanese animator
, Japanese footballer

Japanese masculine given names